Michael J. Whiteman, considered the "dean of restaurant consultants" is president of Baum+Whiteman, a New York-based international food, restaurant and hotel consulting company, responsible for creating high-profile food projects around the world. He is best known as the founding editor of Nation's Restaurant News, established in 1968, and as the business partner of restaurateur, Joe Baum for almost thirty years.

Career
In business for four decades, Whiteman's company created the world's two largest-grossing, restaurants—the Rainbow Room atop Rockefeller Center and Windows on the World; developed three of the world's first food courts—in Japan, Europe and the United States, produced five of New York's three-star restaurants, and created high-profile hotel projects for Starwood, Taj Hotels, Raffles Hotel Group, Hotel Arts Barcelona, the Regent of Sydney, and Equinox in Singapore which was named one of the best hotel dining rooms in the world.

Working with the top names in architecture, graphics, design and food, from I.M Pei, Philip Johnson, Frank Gehry, Robert Stern, Robert Venturi, Milton Glaser, to James Beard, Julia Child, and Jacques Pepin, Whiteman’s firm creates new concepts for diverse sections of the food industry: including supermarkets, museums, amusement parks, hotel lobbies, drinking bars, restaurants, private clubs and botanical gardens.

As founding editor of Nation’s Restaurant News, in 1968, Whiteman built the industry’s first trade publication. A sought-after food futurist, Whiteman is a frequent speaker on trends, social ergonomics, design, service, finance, and the foundations of creating a successful business in food and hospitality.

Currently his company is creating food and beverage concepts for a two-hotel convention center in Mumbai which will include more than 15 places to eat and drink; is developing five F&B venues for a new hotel in northern Punjab, and is initiating a master plan for a high-end mixed-use development project in Miami.

Whiteman is a frequent contributor to national magazines and writes an annual global food trends report. He is the recipient of the Silver Spoon Award bestowed by Food Arts Magazine. He lives in New York with his wife, Rozanne Gold, the four-time James Beard award-winning chef and author. Whiteman has two children, Jeremy Whiteman and Shayna DePersia.

References

American restaurateurs